LMR Liepāja was a Latvian football club that in the early 1960s won the Latvian Cup two years in a row and was then disbanded because of a disciplinary decision.

Club history

The club appeared in 1961 and it was coached by one of the most popular former Liepāja footballers Harijs Feldmanis. In 1961 the club for which played several former players from the main Liepāja club – Geislers, Lazdenieks, Āboltiņš, Prokofjevs, Gusevs, Jānis Karaškēvičs, E.Feldmanis reached the Latvian Cup semifinals, but in 1962 it sensationally won the Latvian Cup although LMR didn't even play in the top Latvian league.

In 1963 LMR strengthened with previous season champion of Latvia with ASK Rīga Harijs Balcers made its debut in the republican league with a bang – five victories in first five matches. Although the rest of the season wasn't as brilliant and the club finished only fourth in the Latvian league (a result still unsurpassed by any Liepāja club for three decades). But in the Latvian Cup LMR got to another victory, but this victory later proved to be the beginning of the end for the club.

As winners of the Latvian Cup LMR participated in the Soviet Cup and after a loss in Dnipropetrovsk the clubs footballers made a mess in the train and were evicted by police from the train. A report about the incident was published in the main Soviet sports newspaper and it was clear that the story of LMR wouldn't have a happy ending.

Another Liepāja club – Dinamo Liepāja – meanwhile wanted to play in the Latvian league instead of LMR and the club managed to persuade the football officials that LMR should be disqualified and so it was and Dinamo got a place in the top league but all LMR players were disqualified. Of LMR footballers only Voldemārs Frīdenbergs later played on a high level – for Zvejnieks Liepāja.

Sport in Liepāja
Defunct football clubs in Latvia